Jelica Pavličić-Štefančić (born 4 February 1954) is a retired Croatian sprinter. She competed for Yugoslavia in the women's 400 metres at the 1976 Summer Olympics.

References

External links
 

1954 births
Living people
Athletes (track and field) at the 1976 Summer Olympics
Croatian female sprinters
Yugoslav female sprinters
Olympic athletes of Yugoslavia
People from Slunj
Mediterranean Games gold medalists for Yugoslavia
Mediterranean Games medalists in athletics
Athletes (track and field) at the 1975 Mediterranean Games
Athletes (track and field) at the 1979 Mediterranean Games
Universiade bronze medalists for Yugoslavia
Universiade medalists in athletics (track and field)
Medalists at the 1975 Summer Universiade
Olympic female sprinters